Hotovlja is a settlement on the right bank of the Poljane Sora River, opposite Poljane nad Škofjo Loko, in the Municipality of Gorenja Vas–Poljane in the Upper Carniola region of Slovenia.

Name
The name of the settlement was changed from Hotovlje to Hotovlja in 1993. In the past the German name was Hotaule.

Notable people
Notable people that were born or lived in Hotovlja include:
Ignatius Mrak (1810–1901), Bishop of the Diocese of Marquette
Ive Šubic (1922–1989), painter and illustrator
Štefan Šubic (1820–1884), painter and sculptor

References

External links 

Hotovlja on Geopedia

Populated places in the Municipality of Gorenja vas-Poljane